Bappa Rawal (c. 8th century)  was a king of the Mewar kingdom in Rajasthan, India. The bardic chronicles describe him as a member of the Guhila Rajput Clan, and some of them consider him to be the founder of the Guhila dynasty. He is credited with repelling the Arab invasion of India. Different historians have identified him with various rulers of the Guhila dynasty, including Kalabhoja, Shiladitya, and Khumana.

Legendary accounts 

According to the 15th century text Ekalinga Mahatmya (also called Ekalinga Purana), Bappa was the ninth descendant of the Guhila dynasty's founder Guhadatta. The text credits him with establishing the Mewar Kingdom in 728 CE, and with building the Eklingji temple.

The Ekalinga Mahatmya and other bardic chronicles state that Bappa's father Nagaditya and all other male members of his family were killed in a battle with the Bhils of Idar. He remained in disguise, accompanied by his two loyal Bhil attendants. He was brought up by a Brahmin lady of Nagda, who employed him as a caretaker of cows. One day, he met the sage Harit Rashi. The sage agreed to initiate him into a Shaivite order, and to grant him immortality and supernatural powers. With this power, he defeated his father's killers, and established the Mewar Kingdom.

According to legends the rishi also encouraged Bappa to build renowned Eklingji Temple at Nagda, which has been family deity of rulers of Mewar ever since.

Indologist David Gordon White notes that there is a similar legend involving the sage Gorakhnath and the Gorkha king Prithvi Narayan Shah. The 11th century writer Al-Biruni has also recorded a similar legend involving the alchemist Vyadi and the king Vikramaditya.

Historicity

Period 

The exact period of Bappa Rawal is not certain. According to the Ekalinga Mahatmya, Bappa Rawal established the Mewar Kingdom in 728 CE, and abdicated the throne in 753 CE. D. R. Bhandarkar and G. H. Ojha believed this to be an authentic date.

Identification 

The word "Bappa" means "father", and Rawal is a royal title. Therefore, scholars such as C. V. Vaidya, D. R. Bhandarkar, G. H. Ojha, and Kaviraj Shyamaldas believe that "Bappa Rawal" is not a proper noun.

Bappa Rawal is mentioned in some inscriptions that provide genealogical lists of the Guhila dynasty, but other inscriptions containing such lists do not mention him. For example, he is mentioned in the 959 CE Unawas inscription and the 971 CE Ekling inscription. However, the 977 CE Atpur inscription and the 1083 CE Kadmal inscription do not mention him. Therefore, the historians have assumed that "Bappa Rawal" is an epithet for one of the Guhila rulers, and different scholars have tried to identify him with different Guhila kings.

According to the Atpur and Kadmal inscriptions, the Guhila ruler Mahendra was succeeded by Kalabhoja. Several historians, such as G. H. Ojha, have identified Bappa Rawal as Kalabhoja, because the 977 CE Atpur inscription mentions Khumana as a son of Kalabhoja, and the 1404 CE Uparaganva (Dungarpur) inscription of Maharawal Pata names Khumana as the son of Bappa Rawal. R. V. Somani endorses this identification, but cautions that the evidence is not conclusive: Bappa Rawal may have been a different ruler who belonged to another branch of the Guhilas.

The Atpur inscription names Śila as the successor of Nāga, and predecessor of Aparājita. The 1460 CE Kumbhalgarh inscription names  Bappa as the successor of Nāga, and predecessor of Aparājita. This suggests that Bappa Rawal was another name for Shiladitya (Śila), the great-grandfather of Kalabhoja. Based on this evidence, Dasharatha Sharma and D. C. Sircar have identified Bappa Rawal with Shiladitya. However, R. V. Somani disputes this identification, arguing that this inscription contains several errors, including naming Bappa Rawal as the father of Guhadatta (who was the dynasty's founder according to some other inscriptions).

Some other historians, such as D. R. Bhandarkar, identified Bappa Rawal with Kalabhoja's son Khumana, based on the calculation of average reign of the Guhila rulers.

Military career 

According to some legends, Bappa Rawal captured famous Chitrakuta (Chittor Fort) from the mlechchhas. Scholars such as R. C. Majumdar and R. V. Somani theorize that the Arab invaders defeated the former rulers of Chittor, and Bappa Rawal gained control of Chittor after repulsing the Arab invaders. According to Majumdar, the Moris (Mauryas) were ruling at Chittor when the Arabs (mlechchhas) invaded north-western India around 725 CE. The Arabs defeated the Moris, and in turn, were defeated by a confederacy that included Bappa Rawal. Majumdar believes that his heroics against the Arabs raised Bappa Rawal's status to such an extent that he wrongly came to be regarded as the founder of the dynasty. R. V. Somani theorized that Bappa was a part of the anti-Arab confederacy formed by the Pratihara ruler Nagabhata I.

Shyam Manohar Mishra of Lucknow University theorized that Bappa Rawal was originally a vassal of the Mori ruler Manuraja (Maan Maurya). He probably led the Mori campaign against the Arabs, which made him more famous than his overlord. Later, he either deposed Manuraja (Maan Maurya), or became the king after Manuraja died childless.

War with Rashtrakutas, Cholas and Karnatakas 

After successful campaigns against Arabs, several conflicts occur in India most famously between Pratiharas and Rashtrakutas, Rashtrakuta king Dantidurga occupied Uijain and performed Hiranyagarbh ceremony there, however in short time, Rashtrakutas left and Nagbhat regained his power, in these conflicts, Bappa Rawal also faced Dantidurga armies by helping Pratiharas in their struggle, thus succeeded in capturing the eastern parts of Mewar region, he also contested with Karanatakas and the Cholas as described in the inscription of Chittod.

Gold coins 

Multiple gold coins, bearing the Nagari legend "Shri Voppa" or "Shri Vopparaja" have been attributed to Bappa Rawal. However, the identification of Voppa or Vopparaja with Bappa Rawal is disputed. These coins have been alternatively attributed to the king Vappuka of Surasena dynasty, who is mentioned in a 955 CE (1012 VS) inscription from Bayana.

One gold coin bears the legend "Shri Voppa", and features Shavite icons: a trishula (trident), a linga, and a bull. Below these is the image of a man in prostrate position. The man has features with large pierced ears, and the holes are exaggerated. According to Indoligst David Gordon White, this may be a representation of Bappa's initiation into a Shaivite sect, as ear piercing has been associated with the Nath Siddhas (a Shaivite sect), who were custodians of the Eklingji shrine before the 16th century. White, however, believes that Bappa is more likely to have been initiated into the Pashupata sect. Pashupata names commonly ended in Rashi (IAST: Rāśi), and thus, Harit Rashi was likely a Pashupata sage. Moreover, "Rawal" (from Sanskrit rāja-kula, "royal lineage") was the name of a clan among the Pashupatas in the 8th century: in the 13th century, this clan was absorbed into the Nath sect.

One gold coin features a haloed Rama holding bow and arrow, with a bull to his left, and an elephant to his right. The other side of the coin features an enthroned ruler with attendants on his sides, with the legend "Shri Voppa" below.

Another gold coin features the legend "Shri Vopparaja", with the images of a bull, a trident, a linga, and an attendant. The other side features a cow with a suckling calf.

Monuments 

 Shri Bappa Rawal Temple is dedicated to Bappa Rawal is in Mathatha, Rajasthan located close to the Eklingji temple, 24 kilometres north of Udaipur.

In popular culture 

The 1925 Indian silent Mewadpati Bappa Rawal portrayed Rawal's life on screen.

References

Bibliography 

 
 
 
 
 
 
 
 

Mewar dynasty
Hindu monarchs
Year of birth uncertain
Year of death uncertain